Liliane Montevecchi (October 13, 1932 – June 29, 2018) was a French-Italian actress, dancer, and singer.

Career
Montevecchi took her first dance classes at 8 with Pierre Duprez, primo ballerino of the Opera in Paris, France. She entered the Conservatoire and completed her training of two years, with Jeanne Schwarz and Mathilde Kschessinska, on the stage of the Opéra Comique. She appeared for the first time on a stage at the Champs Elysées theater in a ballet by David Lichine. She then worked with Léonide Massine and danced in Monte Carlo for the coronation of Rainier III, Prince of Monaco in 1949. She also danced her first steps at the Casino de Paris with Jean Guélis.

Montevecchi began her international career as a prima ballerina in Roland Petit's dance company. She appeared in The Glass Slipper with Michael Wilding and Daddy Long Legs (with Fred Astaire), in both of which she was acting with leading lady Leslie Caron. In the mid-1950s, she was signed to a contract by MGM, which cast her in various roles in such films as Moonfleet with Stewart Granger and Meet Me in Las Vegas with Cyd Charisse and John Brascia. She then played in the Jerry Lewis vehicle The Sad Sack, King Creole with Elvis Presley, and The Young Lions with Montgomery Clift, Dean Martin and Marlon Brando. She knew Gene Kelly, Elizabeth Taylor and Clark Gable, and she took classes at the Actors Studio in New York.

Montevecchi replaced Colette Brosset in the 1958 Broadway revue La Plume de Ma Tante. After some television work in series such as Playhouse 90 and Adventures in Paradise at the end of the decade, Montevecchi opted to leave Hollywood for a star spot in the Folies Bergère in Las Vegas, toured with the company for nine years before appearing at the Folies Bergère in Paris from 1972 to 1978. In 1982, she drew the attention of critics and audiences for her performance in Nine, with Raúl Juliá, for which she won both the Tony and Drama Desk Award for Best Featured Actress in a Musical. Seven years later, she starred in Grand Hotel, earning a Tony nomination for Best Actress in a Musical.

On TV, she guest–starred in more than 20 shows. Montevecchi also appeared in the films Wall Street and How to Lose a Guy in 10 Days with Matthew McConaughey. She appeared in concert at Carnegie Hall and Lincoln Center and toured internationally with her semi-autobiographical shows On the Boulevard and Back on the Boulevard. Her solo album On the Boulevard is available from Jay Records. She is featured in the recording of the 1985 concert version of Follies staged at Avery Fisher Hall, and she has starred in musicals such as Irma La Douce, Gigi and Hello Dolly!. 

In 1998, she replaced Eartha Kitt as The Wicked Witch of the West in Radio City Entertainment's touring production of The Wizard of Oz, co-starring Mickey Rooney as The Wizard and Jessica Grové as Dorothy. She continued with the show until the spring of 1999 and was succeeded by Jo Anne Worley.

In 2001, Montevecchi appeared as Mistinguett at the Théâtre National de l’Opéra Comique in Paris.

In Seattle, Washington, D.C., and San Francisco, Montevecchi had a very successful turn as Madame ZinZanni at Teatro ZinZanni beginning with the production at its opening, with Frank Ferrante, Michael Davis (juggler), Les Castors, Dreya Weber, and Mat Plendl. She took part in the recording of the album The Divas with Joan Baez, Thelma Houston, Sally Kellerman, Christine Deaver, Debbie de Coudreaux, Francine Reed, Juliana Rambaldi and Kristin Clayton in 2006. 

She returned to Teatro ZinZanni in June 2009 to reprise the role and in September 2011 in the show Bonsoir Liliane!, starring with Kevin Kent, directed by Tommy Tune and choreographed by Tobias Larsson.

In December 2010, Kaye Ballard, Montevecchi and Donna McKechnie starred in From Broadway with Love, directed by Richard Jay-Alexander and staged at the Lensic Theater. In early 2012, she joined Kaye Ballard and Lee Roy Reams for the musical review Doin' It for Love, directed by David Geist.

In March 2015, Montevecchi won critical praise for recreating her Tony-nominated role of Grushinskaya in Grand Hotel: The 25th Anniversary Reunion Concert at 54 Below in New York City.

In November 2015, at the behest of producer Patrick Niedo, Montevecchi brought her solo show Aller-Retour (Round Trip) to Paris for the first time.

On July 12, 2017, she joined Francesca Capetta and Stacy Sullivan for a birthday salute to the late film star and recording artist Dean Martin in the Weill Recital Hall at New York’s Carnegie Hall.

Montevecchi died on June 29, 2018, at age 85. A memorial service was held July 6, 2018, at Gotham Hall in New York City  and she was buried in Gambais, France.

Awards and nominations
In 1982, Montevecchi won both the Tony and Drama Desk Award for Best Featured Actress in a Musical for her performance as Liliane La Fleur in Nine.

Active in a number of humanitarian causes including fights against AIDS and cancer, Montevecchi was knighted by the Knights of Malta in 1985. 

She earned a Tony nomination for Best Actress in a Musical for her performance as Elizaveta Grushinskaya in Grand Hotel in 1990.

She was given the Columbus Citizens Foundation's 1995 Woman of the Year Award.

In April 2009, she was honored as "Entertainer of the Year" Boys' Towns of Italy at their 64th Annual "Ball of the Year" Gala.

She was honored by the French Minister of Culture as the "Officer of Arts and Culture" to France and the world at large in 2013.

In January 2017, Montevecchi was given the Lifetime Achievement Award by the Ziegfeld Society of New York City.

Filmography and roles

 Women of Paris (1953) as Une Femme de Paris (as Montevecchi)
 The Glass Slipper (1955) as Tehara
 Daddy Long Legs (1955) as College Girl (uncredited)
 Moonfleet (1955) (as Liliane Montevecchi of the Ballet de Paris) as Gypsy
 Meet Me in Las Vegas (1956) (a.k.a. Viva Las Vegas!) (UK) as Lilli
 The Living Idol (1957) (a.k.a. El Ídolo viviente) (Mexico) as Juanita
 The Sad Sack (1957) as Zita
 The Young Lions (1958) as Françoise
 King Creole (1958) as Forty Nina
 Me and the Colonel (1958) as Cosette
 77 Sunset Strip (1959, TV series) as Tosca
 Behind Closed Doors (1959, TV Series) as Marcella
 Playhouse 90 (1959, TV series) as Estrella / Carla
 Adventures in Paradise (1959, TV Series) as Therese Privaux
 The Tab Hunter Show (1960–1961, TV series) as Andrea / Maria
 Mr. Broadway (1964, TV series) as Vici
 T.H.E. Cat (1967, TV series) as Countess De Laurent
 It Takes a Thief (1969, TV Series) as Madame Tanya Varhos
 39° Gala de l'Union des Artistes at the cirque d'hiver in Paris (1972)
 La vie rêvée de Vincent Scotto (1973, TV movie) as Gay Deslys
 Musidora (1973, TV movie) as Musidora
 Au théâtre ce soir (1974, TV series) as Francine
 Chobizenesse (1975) (a.k.a. Show Business, English title) as Gigi Nietzsche
 Wall Street (1987) as Woman at 'Le Cirque'
 The Funny Face of Broadway (1997, documentary by Rémy Batteault)
 Of Penguins and Peacocks (2000, TV movie) as Sarah Bernhardt
 Mistinguett, la dernière revue (2001, TV movie) as Mistinguett
 An Evening with Rosanne Seaborn (2001, TV movie) as Mrs. Mannering
 L'Idole (2002) (a.k.a. The Idol, English title) as Nicole
 How to Lose a Guy in 10 Days (2003) as Mrs. DeLauer
 Comment j'ai accepté ma place parmi les mortels (2008, short) as Mirna
 Jours de France (2016) (a.k.a. 4 Days in France, English title) as Judith Joubert (final film role)

Stage work
 La Croqueuse de Diamants (1952), Théâtre de l’Empire, Paris, France
 La Plume de Ma Tante, original Broadway production (1958), Broadway
 La Grosse Valse (1962-1963), Théâtre des Variétés, Paris, France as Nana
 Folies Bergère, original Broadway production (1964), Broadway
 Nine, original Broadway production (1982), Broadway as Liliane La Fleur
 Gotta Getaway! (1984) Radio City Music Hall, New York
 Irma La Douce (1986) with Robert Clary, Atlantic City
 Star Dust, concert reading (1987), New York
 On the Boulevard (1988), Kaufman Theatre, New York
 Nymph Errant, London concert revival (1989), West End, London, UK
 Grand Hotel, original Broadway production (1989), Broadway as Elizaveta Grushinskaya
 Grand Hotel, national tour (1992), US Tour
 Nine, London concert revival (1992), West End, London, UK as Liliane La Fleur
 Grand Hotel, London production (1992), West End, London, UK as Elizaveta Grushinskaya
 Hello, Dolly! (1995), Opéra Royal de Wallonie, Liège, Belgium
 Gigi (1996) with Gavin MacLeod, Paper Mill Playhouse, Millburn, New Jersey
 Back on the Boulevard (1996), Kaufman Theatre, New York
 Divorce Me, Darling!, Regional Revival (1997), UK
 Gigi (1998) with Gavin MacLeod, TX's Theatre Under the Stars, Houston, Texas
 Follies, Paper Mill Playhouse Revival (1998), Millburn, New Jersey as Solange Lafitte
 The Wizard of Oz, Radio City Entertainment's touring production (1998-1999) as The Wicked Witch of the West
 Mistinguett, la dernière revue (2001), Opéra Comique, Paris, France as Mistinguett
 Love, Chaos and Dinner (2002-2003), Teatro ZinZanni, San Francisco, California as Madame ZinZanni
 The Boy Friend, regional revival (2003), UK as Madame Dubonnet
 Love, Chaos and Dinner (2007), Teatro ZinZanni, Seattle, Washington as Madame ZinZanni
 A La Folie! (2008) with Michael Davis (juggler), Teatro ZinZanni, San Francisco, California
 Back on the Boulevard (2009), Pizza on the Park, London, UK
 Bottega ZinZanni : All Dressed Up with Some Place to Go (2009), Teatro ZinZanni, Seattle, Washington as Dina Monte
 Majestic (2009) with Les Castors, Palazzo, Vienna, Austria
 From Broadway With Love (2010) with Kaye Ballard & Donna McKechnie, Lensic Theater, Santa Fe, New Mexico
 Tigerplast Varieté Show (2011), Tigerpalast, Frankfurt, Germany
 Bonsoir Liliane! (2011), Teatro ZinZanni, Seattle, Washington
 Doin' It For Love (2012) with Kaye Ballard & Lee Roy Reams, Austin, TX & Wilshire Ebell Theatre, Los Angeles, California
 Broadway Babes ONE NIGHT ONLY (2014) with Kaye Ballard & Donna McKechnie, Albuquerque, New Mexico
 Zazou (2014), The York Theatre, New York
 Tigerplast Varieté Show (2014), Tigerpalast, Frankfurt, Germany
 Paris on the Thames (2015), Brasserie Zédel, London, UK
 54 Sings Grand Hotel: The 25th Anniversary Concert (2015), Feinstein's/54 Below, New York as Elizaveta Grushinskaya
 An intimate evening with Liliane Montevecchi (2015), The Mansion Inn, Rock City Falls, New York
 Steve Ross on Broadway (2015), Birdland Jazz Club, New York
 A Classic Night: A Tribute to Liliane Montevecchi (2015), Alvin Ailey Theatre, New York
 Tigerplast Varieté Show (2015), Tigerpalast, Frankfurt, Germany
 Aller-Retour, musical review (2015), Vingtième Théâtre, Paris, France
 Concert les Funambules (2015), Sunset/Sunside, Paris, France
 Be My Valentine (2016), Feinstein's/54 Below, New York
 Liliane Montevecchi Live at Zédel (2016), Brasserie Zédel, London, UK
 Tigerplast Varieté Show (2016), Tigerpalast, Frankfurt, Germany
 Hotel l'Amour (2016) with Frank Ferrante, Teatro ZinZanni, Seattle, Washington
 Ziegfeld Follies of the Air: The New 1934 Live from Broadway Broadcast Revue (2017), Birdland Jazz Club, New York
 We'll Take a Glass Together: The Songs of Wright & Forrest from MGM to Grand Hotel (2017) with Karen Akers, Ida K. Lang Recital Hall at Hunter College, New York
 Francesca Capetta sings Dean Martin: A Centennial Celebration (2017), Carnegie Hall, New York

Other works 
 The Hollywood Palace as herself - Singer / ... (3 episodes, 1965–1966) - Episode #4.10 (1966) TV episode as herself - Singer - Episode #3.19 (1966) TV episode as herself - Singer/Dancer - Episode #2.29 (1965) TV episode as herself - Singer/Dancer
 The 36th Annual Tony Awards (1982) (TV) as herself - Winner : Best Performance by a Featured Actress in a Musical
 The 37th Annual Tony Awards (1983) (TV) as herself - Presenter
 Follies in Concert (1986) (TV) as Solange Lafitte
 The 44th Annual Tony Awards (1990) (TV) as herself - Nominee: Best Actress in a Musical
 NBC's "The Tonight Show starring Johnny Carson" with Jay Leno - Season 29 (1991) (TV) as herself - Guest
 Tout le monde en parle as herself (1 episode, dated 28 April 2001)
 Broadway The Golden Age, by the Legends Who Were There (2003) as herself a.k.a. Broadway (USA: short title) a.k.a. Broadway: The Golden Age (USA: short title) a.k.a. Broadway: The Movie (USA: short title)

Albums 
 C'est beau l'amour à Paris/Grain de poivre, Versailles, 1981
 Nine: Original Cast Album (cast recording), Sony, 1982
 Follies in Concert (cast recording), RCA, 1985
 Nymph Errant, EMI, 1990
 Grand Hotel: The Musical - Broadway Cast Recording (cast recording), RCA, 1992
 Nine (1992 London Concert, cast recording), RCA, 1992
 There's No Business Like Show Business: Broadway Showstoppers, Sony, 1993
 Divorce Me Darling! (cast recording), Jay Records, 1998
 Follies - The Complete Recording (cast recording), Tee Vee Toons, 1998
 On the Boulevard (original cast), Jay Records, 1998
 La Tournée des Grands Ducs (various artists), Idol/Marianne Melodie, 2005
 The Divas, One Reel/Teatro ZinZanni, 2006
 BROADWAY: THE GREAT ORIGINAL CAST RECORDINGS, Masterworks Broadway, 2015
 Les Funambules (chansons d'amour pour tous), Blossom, 2017

References

External links
 

1932 births
2018 deaths
Actresses from Paris
French female dancers
Italian female dancers
Italian television actresses
French television actresses
French people of Italian descent
French film actresses
French vedettes
20th-century French actresses
21st-century French actresses
20th-century Italian actresses
21st-century Italian actresses
Italian film actresses